Keep Your Friends and Loves Close. Keep the City You Call Home Closer is a live EP by the indie rock band Headlights.  It was released in 2007 through the Polyvinyl Record Company.

Track listing 

 Put Us Back Together Right (live on WOXY.com)
 Lions (live on WOXY.com)
 Owl Eyes (live on Indie 103.1)
 Centuries (live on Indie 103.1)
 Tokyo (live on WOXY.com)
 Songy Darko (live on Daytrotter.com)
 This One (live on Daytrotter.com)

Headlights (band) albums
2007 EPs